is a multi-purpose stadium in Naka, Japan.  It is currently used mostly for football matches and track and field events. It served as the main home ground of Mito HollyHock through 2011. The stadium holds 22,022 people and was built in 1998.

It is a community stadium, and any person or group can use an unoccupied facility at any time the stadium is open. A vending machine sells tickets for this purpose in the main lobby.

External links
 

Football venues in Japan
Athletics (track and field) venues in Japan
Multi-purpose stadiums in Japan
Sports venues in Ibaraki Prefecture
Naka, Ibaraki